Niels Mueller (born 1961) is an American film director, screenwriter, and film producer. His directorial debut film, The Assassination of Richard Nixon, screened at the 2004 Cannes Film Festival.

Biography
Mueller was born and raised in Milwaukee, Wisconsin, and attended Tufts University, where he earned a BA. While an undergraduate, he collaborated with fellow student Gary Winick on a number of independent film projects. Mueller subsequently attended film school at UCLA where he earned an MFA. His most notable work remains The Assassination of Richard Nixon (2004), starring Sean Penn, which he directed and also co-wrote with Kevin Kennedy. Other writing projects include Tadpole (2002), which he co-wrote, 13 Going on 30 (2004), although he lost an initial writing credit on this latter film in a subsequent dispute arbitrated by the Writers Guild of America. A pilot he wrote with Kevin Kennedy, The Defenders, was picked up by CBS television for the fall 2010 season. The series, starring James Belushi and Jerry O'Connell, chronicled the adventures of two defense attorneys in Las Vegas.

Filmography

Filmography
 Sweet Nothing (1995) - editor
 Tadpole (2002) - writer
 Swimfan (2002) - production consultant
 The Assassination of Richard Nixon (2004) - director/writer
 The Flock (2007) - co-producer
 Tracks (2009) - producer
 Jessica (2016) - executive producer
 Small Town Wisconsin (2020) - director

Television
 The Defenders (2010) - writer

References

External links
 
 

American film directors
American male screenwriters
Tufts University alumni
UCLA Film School alumni
Filmmakers from Milwaukee
Living people
Writers from Milwaukee
1961 births
Screenwriters from Wisconsin
Film producers from Wisconsin